Heterogeneous nuclear ribonucleoprotein D0 (HNRNPD) also known as AU-rich element RNA-binding protein 1 (AUF1) is a protein that in humans is encoded by the HNRNPD gene. Alternative splicing of this gene results in four transcript variants.

Function 

This gene belongs to the subfamily of ubiquitously expressed heterogeneous nuclear ribonucleoproteins (hnRNPs). The hnRNPs are nucleic acid binding proteins and they complex with heterogeneous nuclear RNA (hnRNA). The interaction sites on the RNA are frequently biased towards particular sequence motifs. These proteins are associated with pre-mRNAs in the nucleus and appear to influence pre-mRNA processing and other aspects of mRNA metabolism and transport. While all of the hnRNPs are present in the nucleus, some seem to shuttle between the nucleus and the cytoplasm. The hnRNP proteins have distinct nucleic acid binding properties. The protein encoded by this gene has two repeats of quasi-RRM domains that bind to RNAs. It localizes to both the nucleus and the cytoplasm. This protein is implicated in the regulation of mRNA stability.

Interactions 

HnRNP D has been shown to interact with SAFB and Hsp27. It also has been reported to interact with mRNAs such as Mef2c mRNA.

References

Further reading

External links 
 PDBe-KB provides an overview of all the structure information available in the PDB for Human Heterogeneous nuclear ribonucleoprotein D0 (HNRPD)